Lalon  is a 2004 Bangladeshi film directed by Tanvir Mokammel. The film won Bangladesh National Film Award for Best Art Direction at the 29th Bangladesh National Film Awards.

Plot
The plot is mainly based on the life of Bengali mystic poet Fakir Lalon.

Cast
 Raisul Islam Asad as Lalon
 Azad Abul Kalam as Young Lalon
 Shomi Kaiser as Piyarinnesa
 Wahida Mollick Jolly
 Ramendu Majumdar
 Khurshiduzzaman Utpal

Thanksgiving 
Special thanks to Probal Mokammel for helping throughout the making of this film.

References

External links
 

2004 films
2004 biographical drama films
Bangladeshi biographical drama films
Bangladeshi musical drama films
2000s musical drama films
Bengali-language Bangladeshi films
Films about Lalon
2000s Bengali-language films
Films directed by Tanvir Mokammel
2004 drama films